Special Labor Inspector is a 2019 South Korean television series starring Kim Dong-wook, Park Se-young, Ryu Deok-hwan and Kim Kyung-nam. It aired from April 8 to May 28, 2019 on MBC TV.

Synopsis
The series follows the story of a civil servant who is appointed as a labor inspector in the Ministry of Employment and Labor.

Cast

Main
 Kim Dong-wook as Jo Jin-gap, a pure-hearted, hardworking, and honest person with strong sense of justice. He was once a promising judo athlete but was forced to quit after trying to protest an unfair result. He then attempted to become a fitness teacher, but it did not last long as he was unable to control his quick temper in front of the chairman's son. He eventually studied and passed the level nine civil servant exam and becomes a civil servant for a secured government position. However, everything changes when he is assigned as a labor inspector for the Ministry of Employment and Labor.
 Park Se-young as Joo Mi-ran, Jin-gap's ex-wife who is a former judo athlete turned detective.
 Ryu Deok-hwan as Woo Do-ha, an ace lawyer of the legal department at Myeongseong Group.
 Kim Kyung-nam as Cheon Deok-gu, Jin-gap's former pupil who becomes his loyal secret investigator.

Supporting
 Seol In-ah as Go Mal-sook, the personal secretary of Myeongseong Group's chairperson.
 Oh Dae-hwan as Goo Dae-gil
 Lee Won-jong as Ha Ji-man
 Kang Seo-joon as Lee Dong-young
 Song Ok-sook as Choi Seo-ra
 Go Geon-han as Kim Sun-woo
 Shin Cheol-jin
 Yoo Su-bin
 Lee Sang-yi as Yang Tae-soo

Special appearance
 Lee Gyu-hyun as Lee Chang Gyu, as an intern doctor.

Production
The first script reading of the cast was held in early January 2019. Ryu Deok-hwan and Park Se-young have previously worked together in the 2012 series Faith.

Ratings

Awards and nominations

Notes

References

External links
  
 
 

MBC TV television dramas
Korean-language television shows
2019 South Korean television series debuts
2019 South Korean television series endings
South Korean action television series
South Korean comedy television series